(NRN) is a commercial radio network in Japan. The network was established on May 3, 1965. The network is run by Nippon Cultural Broadcasting, Incorporated (QR) and Nippon Broadcasting System, Incorporated (LF). It is not connected in any way with the National Radio Network in the United States.

National Radio Network  stations

Programs
 All Night Nippon

External links
 

Radio in Japan
Radio networks
Japanese radio networks
Radio stations established in 1965